Milan Davídek (born May 16, 1998) is a Czech professional ice hockey forward currently playing for JHT of the Suomi-sarja.

Davídek previously played 25 games for HC Karlovy Vary during the 2016–17 Czech Extraliga season. He also had loan spells with HC Baník Sokolov and HC Slovan Ústí nad Labem before joining the latter on a permanent contract in 2018.

On July 22, 2020, Davídek joined JHT of the Suomi-sarja.

References

External links

1998 births
Living people
HC Baník Sokolov players
Czech ice hockey forwards
HC Dukla Jihlava players
HC Karlovy Vary players
HC Kobra Praha players
HC ZUBR Přerov players
HC Slovan Ústečtí Lvi players
Ice hockey people from Prague
Czech expatriate ice hockey players in Finland